IFS may refer to:

Companies
 Industrial and Financial Systems - IFS AB, a Swedish company and creator of enterprise software
 International Financial Services Centre - the IFSC is also known as the International Financial Sector (IFS)
 International Film Service - Short-lived animation studio owned by Hearst Communication.

Computer Science
 Iterated function system, a method of constructing fractals in mathematics and computer science
 Internal field separator, a special set of characters in Unix shells
 Interference (intensity) fluctuation spectroscopy, related to dynamic light scattering
 Installable File System, a filesystem API in IBM OS/2 and Microsoft Windows NT
 InfoPath Forms Services - a component of SharePoint Server that allows Microsoft Office InfoPath forms to be hosted in a SharePoint web site and serve and fill them using a browser-based interface

Geographical
 Integrated Forecast System a global meteorological model developed by European Centre for Medium-Range Weather Forecasts
 Irish Free State, a state in Ireland which existed in the early part of the 20th century
 Ifs, Calvados, a commune of the département of Calvados, in the Normandie région, in France

Organisations
 ifs University College, a UK-based, non profit making body providing financial education
 Indian Forest Service, an All India Service with the cadre controlling authority as Ministry of Environment, Forest and Climate Change
 Indian Foreign Service
 Institut für Sexualwissenschaft
 Institute for Fiscal Studies, a UK-based independent economic research institute
 Institutt for Forsvarsstudier, the Norwegian Institute for Defence Studies
 Institut für Sozialforschung, the University of Frankfurt Institute for Social Research
 International Foundation for Science
 International French School Singapore
 International Futures
 International Sumo Federation 
 Internationale Filmschule Köln, a filmschool in Cologne, Germany
 Islamic Foundation School

Science
  Integral field spectroscopy, a technique for astronomical observations
 The Intermediate Frontal Sulcus in Neuroscience
 Isoflavonoid synthase, an enzyme

Technology
 Independent Front Suspension, an early type of front-end independent suspension on many passenger vehicles
 Initial Flight Screening, flight screening used as a prerequisite for Air Force Flight School
Intelligent Front-lighting System is a technology to ensure the visibility of the driver on the road ahead without blinding oncoming drivers with the partial light control capability.

Other
 Internal Family Systems Model, a school of psychotherapy
 International Financial Statistics, a database maintained by the International Monetary Fund
 Importer Security Filing, or 10 + 2, documentation required to import containerized goods into the United States